Canjadude is a village in the Gabú sector of the Gabú Region in north-eastern Guinea-Bissau. It lies to the south of Uelíngarà. Canjadude, along with Catió and other camps were besieged by the Portuguese in 1973.

References

External links
Maplandia World Gazetteer

Populated places in Guinea-Bissau
Gabu Region